A dive bar is typically a small, unglamorous, eclectic, old-style drinking establishment with inexpensive drinks; it may feature dim lighting, shabby or dated decor, neon beer signs, packaged beer sales, cash-only service, and a local clientele. The precise definition of a dive bar is something on which people rarely agree, and is the subject of spirited debates. The term dive was first used in the press in the U.S. in 1880s to describe disreputable places that were often in basements into which one "dives below".

Description
Once considered a derogatory term, dive bar is now a coveted badge of honor bestowed by aficionados looking for authenticity in such establishments. Devotees may describe a bar as "very divey" or "not divey" and compose rating scales of "divey-ness". One such devotee is Steve Vensen, founder of a California group called the DBC (Dive Bar Conoisseurs) who says, "Every dive bar is like a snowflake: diverse and unique. . . you always get local subculture and every time is an adventure." Author Todd Dayton offers the following: "Dives [dive bars] are like pornography: hard to define but you know it when you see it". As to what distinguishes a dive bar from an ordinary bar, Dayton says: 

Dive bars adhere to a minimal level of effort needed to provide guests with drinks; i.e., they typically do not advertise, provide parking, or have fancy signage. Dive bars are not known for their food. They often do not serve food beyond pretzels and snacks. For example, a popular Nashville dive bar has a hand-written menu taped to the refrigerator and lists only pork rinds, popcorn, peanuts and microwaved corn dogs (US $1). True dive bars are "cash only" and would not have computerized registers. Bathrooms in dive bars are notoriously shabby and may have a shower curtain stall. The owner or one of his family members is often working the bar. Dive bars usually have a clientele from all walks of life, including some old locals who have been drinking there for decades.

During the COVID-19 pandemic of the early 2020s, U.S. cities closed down bars and food service establishments and many dive bar owners made repairs and cleaned up while they were closed down. Rick Dobbs, author of a 2019 book Local Spirit: Neighborhood Bars of Orleans Parish, said, "A dive can absolutely be cleaned up but still be a dive... it's the character and spirit of the space that counts".

See also
 List of dive bars
 Types of drinking establishments
 Honky-tonk
 Roadhouse
 Speakeasy
 Drinking culture

References

Further reading

 
 
  150 pages.